Acraspis erinacei, the hedgehog gall wasp, is a species of gall wasp in the family Cynipidae.

References

Cynipidae
Articles created by Qbugbot
Insects described in 1909
Taxa named by William Beutenmuller
Gall-inducing insects